One in Four is a compilation album released by the mental health charity The Scottish Association for Mental Health in 2004. It compiles 14 exclusive and previously unheard tracks recorded by artists who had previously been involved in events run by the charity. 

More than 250,000 copies of the album were distributed to people in Scotland to raise awareness of mental health issues. It takes its name from the statistic that one in four people in Scotland will experience mental health problems at some point in their lives.

Track listing

External links
SAMH One in Four
The Scottish Association for Mental Health

References 

2004 compilation albums
Charity albums